Ananias Curing Saul's Blindness is a 1660 painting by Ciro Ferri, now in the Kunsthistorisches Museum in Vienna. It shows Ananias' visiting Paul of Tarsus to cure his temporary blindness (Acts 9:11-18).

Paintings in the collection of the Kunsthistorisches Museum
1660 paintings
Baroque paintings